Route 81 is a short  south–north state highway located entirely within the city of Fall River, Massachusetts. It begins as a continuation of Rhode Island Route 81 and ends at an interchange with I-195.

History
Prior to the 1960s, much of what is now William S. Canning Boulevard did not exist, as the route passes through former wetlands around the Sucker Brook.  The building of Route 24 helped necessitate its building, and also brought about the rise of the retail areas by 1971.  The building of the route also lessened traffic on Stafford Road, which had been the only road to access what is now Route 81 in Rhode Island.

Route description
The route is a continuation of Rhode Island Route 81, which extends from Adamsville along the Rhode Island-Massachusetts border. The route begins as William S. Canning Boulevard shortly before its intersection with Route 24 at that route's Exit 1.  Form there it proceeds northward, past the SouthCoast Marketplace (formerly the New Harbour Mall) and Fall River Shopping Center.  The road becomes Rhode Island Avenue when it crosses Tucker Street, keeping that designation for  before turning into Plymouth Avenue at that road's intersection with Slade Street and Laurel Street.  It then continues northward, passing Stafford Road, Middle Street and Rodman Street before finally ending at I-195 near the city's center.

Major intersections

References

081
Transportation in Bristol County, Massachusetts